The Commission scolaire de la Rivière-du-Nord (CSRDN) was a francophone school district in the Canadian province of Quebec. Its headquarters are in Saint-Jérôme.

It comprises several primary schools and high schools across municipalities in the Laurentides region. The commission is overseen by a board of elected school trustees.

Schools

Secondary schools
 École secondaire Cap-Jeunesse (Saint-Jérôme)
 École secondaire de Mirabel (Mirabel)
 École secondaire des Hauts-Sommets (Saint-Jérôme)
 École secondaire des-Studios (Saint-Jérôme)
 École polyvalente Lavigne (Lachute)
 École polyvalente Saint-Jérôme (Saint-Jérôme)
 École secondaire Émilien-Frenette (Saint-Jérôme)
 École secondaire Le Tremplin (Lachute)
 École secondaire Saint-Stanislas (Saint-Jérôme)

Primary schools
 du Parchemin (Mirabel)
 à l'Orée-des-Bois (Saint-Colomban)
 à l'Unisson (Mirabel)
 alternative de la Fourmilière (Saint-Jérôme)
 aux Quatre-Vents (Mirabel)
 Bellefeuille (Saint-Jérôme)
 Bouchard (Brownsburg-Chatham)
 Dansereau/Saint-Martin (Grenville)
 de la Croisée-des-Champs (Mirabel)
 De La Durantaye (Saint-Jérôme)
 de la Source (Saint-Jérôme)
 de la Volière (Saint-Colomban)
 de l'Envolée (Saint-Jérôme)
 de l'Horizon-Soleil (Saint-Jérôme)
 des Falaises (Prévost)
 des Hautbois (Saint-Colomban)
 des Hauteurs (Saint-Hippolyte)
 du Champ-Fleuri (Prévost)
 du Joli-Bois (Sainte-Sophie)
 Dubois (Saint-Jérôme)
 Jean-Moreau (Sainte-Sophie)
 l'Oasis (Lachute)
 Mariboisé (Saint-Jérôme)
 Mer-et-Monde (Mirabel)
 Notre-Dame (Saint-Jérôme)
 Prévost (Saint-Jérôme)
 Richer (Saint-Jérôme)
 Sacré-Coeur (Saint-Jérôme)
 Saint-Alexandre (Lachute)
 Saint-André (Saint-André d'Argenteuil)
 Sainte-Anne (Mirabel)
 Sainte-Paule (Saint-Jérôme)
 Sainte-Sophie (Sainte-Sophie)
 Sainte-Thérèse-de-l'Enfant-Jésus (Saint-Jérôme)
 Saint-Hermas (Mirabel)
 Saint-Jean-Baptiste (Saint-Jérôme)
 Saint-Joseph (Saint-Jérôme)
 Saint-Julien (Lachute)
 Saint-Philippe (Brownsburg-Chatham)
 Sans-Frontières (Saint-Jérôme)
 Val-des-Monts (Prévost)

See also
 Sir Wilfrid Laurier School Board (area Anglophone school board)

References

External links
 Commission scolaire de la Rivière-du-Nord 

Historical school districts in Quebec
Education in Laurentides
Saint-Jérôme